Table tennis at the 2014 Asian Para Games was held at the Songdo Global University Gymnasium in Incheon, South Korea from 19 to 24 October 2014.

Participitating Nations
Below is a list of all the participating NPCs

Medal summary

Results

Men

Women

See also
 Table tennis at the 2014 Asian Games

References

External links
Table tennis result

2014 Asian Para Games events
Table tennis at the Asian Para Games